The 2011 West Virginia Mountaineers football team represented West Virginia University in the 2011 NCAA Division I FBS football season as members of the Big East Conference. The Mountaineers were led by Dana Holgorsen, who was in his first season as head coach.  West Virginia played their home games on Mountaineer Field at Milan Puskar Stadium in Morgantown, West Virginia. They finished the season 10–3, 5–2 in Big East play to earn a share of the Big East Conference championship with Cincinnati and Louisville. The Mountaineers, in their final season in the Big East before moving to the Big 12 the following season, earned the league's automatic berth in the BCS due to being the highest ranked of the Big East champions in the final BCS rankings. They were invited to the Orange Bowl for the first time ever where they defeated Clemson 70–33. This was the third victory for West Virginia in three BCS games played in the BCS era (having won BCS bowls in 2006 and 2008), while the 70 points in the Orange Bowl set a record for most points scored in a bowl game (which was matched by Army in 2018).

Previous season
The 2010 West Virginia Mountaineers finished the season at 9–4 with a 5–2 record in Big East play.  They shared the 2010 Big East Football Championship with Pittsburgh and Connecticut, with Connecticut earning the Big East BCS bid by way of tie-breaker.  The Mountaineers were invited to the Champs Sports Bowl where they were defeated by North Carolina State 23–7.

Pre-season

Coaching changes
On December 16, 2010, West Virginia University announced the hiring of former Oklahoma State offensive coordinator Dana Holgorsen. Holgorsen replaces Jeff Mullen as offensive coordinator and will take over as the Mountaineers head coach in 2012.

On January 5, 2011, the Mountaineers announced the hiring of three offensive coaches; Robert Gillespie (Running Backs), Bill Bedenbaugh (Offensive Line), and Shannon Dawson (Inside-Receivers).

On March 10, 2011, it was announced that lone offensive staff holdover Lonnie Galloway (Outside-Receivers) has left West Virginia to take a  coaching job at Wake Forest.

On March 28, 2011, West Virginia University announced the hiring of Daron Roberts as an assistant coach.  Roberts will be working with wide receivers and special teams.

On June 10, 2011, West Virginia University announced that Bill Stewart had resigned as head coach and that Dana Holgorsen would assume the position effective immediately.  Holgorsen has stated he will serve as his own offensive coordinator but that he was unsure who would fill the extra spot on the coaching staff.

On July 8, 2011, Head Coach Dana Holgorsen hired Alex Hammond as recruiting coordinator.

The Mountaineers have retained the entire 2010 defensive coaching staff for the 2011 season.

Key losses
Noel Devine – RB
Jock Sanders – WR
Eric jobe – OL
Scooter berry – DT
Chris neild – DT
Pat lazear – LB
J.T. Thomas – LB
Anthony leonard – LB
Brandon Hogan – CB
Robert sands – S
 Benji Powers- DB

2011 recruits

Spring Game
The 2011 Gold-Blue Spring Game took place on Friday, April 29, 2011, at 7 p.m. at Mountaineer Field. Over 22,000 fans attended to see the Gold team defeat the Blue team 83–17. The game was televised statewide on West Virginia Media stations.

Polls
The Mountaineers were picked to win the Big East Conference by the media at conference media day, picking up 21 out of 24 first place votes.

Coaching staff

Roster

Schedule

Game summaries

Marshall

Series Lead: West Virginia leads 10–0

Recap: WVU picked up the win in a game that was delayed a total of 4 hours, 22 minutes and called with 14:36 left in the 4th quarter.  Following a 3rd quarter Tavon Austin kickoff return for a touchdown that gave the Mountaineers a 27–13 lead with five minutes to play in the third quarter, the game experienced a lightning delay that lasted 3 hours, 6 minutes.  Once resuming play a Vernard Roberts one-yard touchdown run extended the WVU lead to 34–13 early in the fourth quarter, after which the game was once again delayed for lightning.  It was ultimately agreed to by both teams to end the game.  Geno Smith lead the game for WVU going 26–35 for 246 yards and two touchdowns.

Norfolk State

Series Lead: First meeting.

Recap: The Mountaineers overcame a sluggish first half exploding for 45 second half points and ending the game with 533 yards of total offense. Geno Smith went 20–34 for 371 yards and 4 TDs passing.  As a team WVU passed for 431 yards, the most since 1998.

Maryland

Series Lead: West Virginia leads 25–21–2

Recap:
The Mountaineers got off to a fast start, building a 27–10 halftime lead behind the arm of junior quarterback Geno Smith and rushing touchdowns from freshmen Vernard Roberts and Andrew Buie. The lead was built to 24, 34–10, in the third quarter on a Smith connection to high school teammate Stedman Bailey. Maryland scored 21 unanswered points to bring the game to within 3 points, 34–31, before the Mountaineers added another field goal to build their lead to 6, 37–31. The Terrapins drove down the field in an attempt to take the lead, but quarterback Danny O'Brien was intercepted by Eain Smith with 1:13 remaining in the game to seal it for the Mountaineers.

LSU

Series Lead: LSU leads 2–0

ESPN's College GameDay broadcast from Morgantown for the first time.

Recap: Despite outgaining the Tigers 533–366, West Virginia was unable to overcome poor tackling and special teams play.  The Mountaineers also committed four turnovers. West Virginia's Geno Smith set school records for completions (38), attempts (65) and passing yards (463) against LSU's highly regarded defense.

Bowling Green

Series Lead: West Virginia leads 2–0

Recap: West Virginia put together its most complete game of the season as the running game that had struggled in past weeks exploded to the tune of 360.  True freshman Dustin Garrison set a school record for most rushing yards by a freshman with 291, good enough for a tie for the second most total in school history.  WVU's 643 yards of total offense were a Mountaineer Field record.

Connecticut

Series Lead: West Virginia leads 6–1

Recap:

Syracuse

Series Lead: Syracuse leads 31–27

Recap:

Rutgers

Series Lead: West Virginia leads 33–4–2

Recap:
Geno Smith threw two second-half touchdowns to help West Virginia (6–2, 2–1 Big East) post its 17th straight win over Rutgers. WVU trailed 31–21 at the halftime, fighting both the Scarlet Knights offense, and harsh weather conditions. The Mountaineer defense allowed a season-high 31 points in the first half, but shutout Rutgers in the second.  The Mountaineers won their first conference road game of the season, and became bowl-eligible in the process. Smith finished 20–33 for 218 yards, and two touchdowns, while Shawne Alston ran for a career-high 110 yards and two scores on 14 carries

Louisville

Series Lead: West Virginia leads 10–2

Recap:

Cincinnati

Series Lead: West Virginia leads 15–3–1

Recap:West Virginia blocked a game-tying field goal attempt as time expired to secure the win over the #23 ranked Bearcats, WVU's first road win over a team ranked in the AP Top 25 since their last win in Cincinnati during the 2007 season.

Pittsburgh

    
    
    
    
    
    
    

Series Lead: Pitt leads 61–40–3

Recap:

South Florida

Series Lead: Series even at 3–3

Recap:

Orange Bowl

    
    
    
    
    
    
    
    
    
    
    
    
    
    
    
    

Series Lead: Series tied 1–1

Recap: Geno Smith tied a record for any bowl game with six touchdown passes, including four to Tavon Austin, and No. 23 West Virginia set a bowl scoring record by beating No. 14 Clemson 70–33 on Wednesday in the Orange Bowl. Darwin Cook's 99-yard fumble return for a touchdown was one of the Mountaineers' five TDs in the second quarter, including three in the final 2:29 for a 49–20 lead. It was the highest-scoring half by a team in a bowl game. Austin's four TD receptions tied a record for any bowl game, and Smith broke Tom Brady's Orange Bowl record with 407 yards passing. West Virginia's point total broke the bowl record established six nights earlier when Baylor beat Washington 67–56 in the Alamo Bowl.

Rankings

References

West Virginia
West Virginia Mountaineers football seasons
Big East Conference football champion seasons
Orange Bowl champion seasons
Lambert-Meadowlands Trophy seasons
West Virginia Mountaineers football